Gol Gol-e Olya or Golgol-e Olya may refer to:

Gol Gol-e Olya, Abdanan, in Ilam Province
Gol Gol-e Olya, Malekshahi, in Ilam Province
Gol Gol-e Olya, Lorestan